Cinema Varieties is a television program on the DuMont Television Network which was shown on Sunday nights at 8:30pm ET from September 1949 to November 1949. Clips from old movies were shown on this 30-minute program.

Episode status
No episodes of this series are known to exist.

See also
List of programs broadcast by the DuMont Television Network
List of surviving DuMont Television Network broadcasts
1949-50 United States network television schedule

References

Bibliography
David Weinstein, The Forgotten Network: DuMont and the Birth of American Television (Philadelphia: Temple University Press, 2004) 
Alex McNeil, Total Television, Fourth edition (New York: Penguin Books, 1980) 
Tim Brooks and Earle Marsh, The Complete Directory to Prime Time Network TV Shows, Third edition (New York: Ballantine Books, 1964)

External links
Cinema Varieties at IMDB
DuMont Television Network Historical Website: Appendix One: Programs (A-L)

DuMont Television Network original programming
1949 American television series debuts
1949 American television series endings
Black-and-white American television shows